Lothar Blumhagen (16 July 1927 – 10 January 2023) was a German actor, especially known as a voice actor. He began as a stage actor, in ensembles in East Berlin and West Berlin. He was often the German voice of British gentleman characters, such as Roger Moore's, beginning in 1971 with Brett Sinclair in the television series The Persuaders!. He voiced roles by Christopher Plummer from Dragnet in 1987 to Knives Out in 2020.

Biography 
Born in Leipzig,  he made his stage debut there in 1947. He was a stage actor in Leipzig, Halle and Berlin, where he was a member of the ensemble of the Deutsches Theater Berlin from 1954 to 1956. He made his debut in film in the 1954 , and played more roles for the DEFA. He was awarded the title Berliner Staatsschauspieler in 1970. He rarely played in film and television after his DEFA work, but participated in the documentary Zeugin der Zeit – Käthe Kollwitz in 1985 and in the West–East co-production  in 1986.

Blumhagen became known as a voice actor.  He became one of the leading voice actors in Germany, with roles in more than 600 films. His voice was described as dark, raspy and unmistakable ("dunkles, raues Timbre war unverkennbar") and was often chosen to represent British gentleman. He was the German voice for Christopher Plummer, in roles from Reverend Jonathan Whirley in Dragnet in 1987, Arthur Case in Inside Man in 2006, to Harlan Thrombey in the comedy Knives Out in 2020. He was often the German voice of Roger Moore, in roles such as Lord Brett Sinclair, the German version (Die 2) of the action-comedy series The Persuaders!. He was the voice of Jonathan Higgins, played by John Hillerman, in the crime series Magnum, P.I. He became the voice of Christopher Lee (The Skull), Alan Rickman , Erland Josephson, and of Andreas Katsulas as Ambassador G'Kar in Babylon 5. In the 1976 Die Unbestechlichen, the German version of All the President's Men, he was the voice of Deep Throat, a leading role characterised exclusively by his voice.

Blumhagen died in a hospital in Berlin on 10 January 2023, aged 95.

Films 
Films with Blumhagen include: 
 1954: 
 1955: Sommerliebe
 1958: Die Erbin

 1967:  (television film)
 1968: Unwiederbringlich (television film)
 1984: Die Schwärmer

 1985: Zeugin der Zeit – Käthe Kollwitz
 1986:

Voice roles 
Blumhagen's voice roles include:

Christopher Lee
 1965: The Skull as Sir Matthew Phillips
 1969: The Oblong Box as Dr. J. Neuhart
 1978: Der Herr der Karawane as Sardar Khan
 1989: La Révolution française as Henker von Paris
 1990: Gremlins 2: The New Batch as Dr. Catheter

Roger Moore
 1971: Die Zwei
 1980: Sunday Lovers (Vier Asse hauen auf die Pauke) as Harry Lindon
 1981: The Cannonball Run (Auf dem Highway ist die Hölle los as Seymour Goldfarb, Jr.
 1989: The Man Who Haunted Himself (Ein Mann jagt sich selbst as Harold Pelham
 1990: Bullseye! as Garald Bradley-Smith / Sir John Bevistock
 1994: The Man Who Wouldn't Die (Der Mann, der niemals starb as Thomas Grace/ Inspector Fulbright
 2011: A Princess for Christmas (Eine Prinzessin zu Weihnachten as Edward Duke of Castlebury

Christopher Plummer
 1987: Dragnet as Reverend Jonathan Whirley
 1996: Verschwörung der Angst as Joseph Wakeman
 2001: A Beautiful Mind as Dr. Rosen
 2004: Alexander as Aristoteles
 2005: Must Love Dogs as Bill
 2006: Inside Man as Arthur Case

References

Further reading 
 Hermann J. Huber: , Albert Langen • Georg Müller Verlag, Munich and Vienna 1986, ISBN 3-7844-2058-3, p. 82.

External links 
 
 

1927 births
2023 deaths
Actors from Leipzig
German male film actors
German male stage actors
German male voice actors